Amy Lynn Bradley (born May 12, 1974) is an American woman who went missing during a Caribbean cruise on the Royal Caribbean International cruise ship Rhapsody of the Seas in late March 1998 at the age of 23 while en route to Curaçao. Her whereabouts remain unknown to this day. She was a 23-year-old Longwood University graduate at the time of her disappearance.

After midnight on Monday March 23, 1998, Amy and her younger brother Brad headed to the ship's nightclub to go dancing. Records show that Brad decided to return to his cabin earlier than Amy. The ship's door lock records show that Brad had entered his cabin at around 3:35 AM, and Amy soon followed five minutes later. The two chatted before heading to bed. Amy's father Ron awoke around 6:00 AM to check on his daughter only to find her missing from the balcony she earlier had slept on.

When authorities were alerted that Amy was missing, the Netherlands Antilles Coast Guard conducted a four-day search in the surrounding waters and along the cruise lines to no result. Authorities began to speculate that she may have fallen overboard and drowned, but investigators have rejected this theory as Amy was known to be a strong swimmer and searches turned up no sign of her. There have been possible sightings of Bradley in Curaçao. In August 1998, tourists saw a woman resembling Bradley on a beach and in 1999 a member of the U.S. Navy claimed a woman in a brothel said she was Bradley and asked him for help.

In the years after Amy's disappearance, there would arise some new evidence leading to theories including Amy being sold into a human trafficking industry or potential remains. The case has been presented on Dr. Phil in a segment entitled The Search for Natalee: Amy Bradley, the case was also presented on America's Most Wanted.

Background 
Amy Lynn Bradley was born on May 12, 1974 in Petersburg, Virginia. She was a resident of Chesterfield County, Virginia. She attended a local university, Longwood University, graduating with a degree in Physical Education. She attended with a scholarship in basketball and was known for her strong swimming abilities as well as having previously worked as a lifeguard. Amy was planning to start a new job at a computer consulting firm after she graduated university.

As a celebratory event, Amy decided to join her family on a cruise vacation on the Royal Caribbean International cruise ship Rhapsody of the Seas en route for Curaçao, a Dutch Caribbean island under the Kingdom of the Netherlands.

Prior to the disappearance 

On March 21, 1998, Amy and her family boarded the cruise towards Curaçao. Prior to the time of the disappearance, Amy and her brother Brad decided to stay up late dancing to a Mardi Gras nightclub party on the ship and drink alcohol with the ship’s band, Blue Orchid. One of the band’s members, Alister Douglas, otherwise known as ‘Yellow’ was drinking with Amy that night where he claimed that he left the party at around 1:00 am. At the time, a videographer known as Chris Fenwick was also able to capture the moment where Amy and Yellow were dancing.

After a couple of hours, Brad decided to rest for the rest of the night at the family cabin at around 3:35 am. The ship’s computerized door lock system recorded that Brad returned to the cabin at 3:35 am where Amy followed five minutes later. Brad reported that he and his sister sat on the suite’s balcony and talked before he went to sleep while Amy stayed awake for a while longer before she fell asleep shortly after.

Disappearance 
Between the times of 5:15 am and 5:30 am 24 March 1998, Amy’s father Ron woke up and got up to check on the status of his children where he saw Amy still sleeping on the lounge chair of their cabin’s balcony. Ron told local papers – “could see Amy’s legs from her hips down. […] I dozed back off to sleep. The balcony door was closed, because if it hadn’t been closed, I would have gotten up and closed it. When he got up at 06:00 am, however, she was missing along with her cigarettes and lighter. He later said, "I left to try and go up and find her. When I couldn't find her, I didn't really know what to think, because it was very much unlike Amy to leave and not tell us where she was going." After Ron searched the common areas of the cruise, Ron woke up the rest of the family and told them Amy was missing at 6:30 am.

Investigation 
Amy’s family immediately reported the missing case to the onboard crew where they continued to plead with the crew members to keep the 2,000 passengers from disembarking the cruise and to make an announcement to assist in finding Amy. However, the team at the purser’s office informed them that it was too early to make a ship-wide announcement. The crew agreed to issue an announcement at 7:50 am after a majority of the passengers left the ship announcing, “Will Amy Bradley please come to the purser’s desk?”. Between 12:15 pm and 1:00 pm, the cruise staff searched through the ship but could not find Amy. The delay that the crew put on the search and investigation of the disappearance has been said to have led to lowering the chance of finding Amy by allowing the passengers to disembark ignoring the Bradley family's advice.

The Dutch Caribbean Coast Guard conducted a four-day search that ended on 27 March 1998 and Royal Caribbean Cruise Lines chartered a boat to continue looking for her. The Coast Guard used three helicopters and a radar plane to assist in the search.

Possible sightings 
Initially, the authorities suspected that Amy had either fallen overboard or committed suicide. However, this speculation was soon discredited as Amy was known to be a strong swimmer and her body was never found in the waters as well as no evidence of foul play.

On the morning of the disappearance, two passengers told Ron that they saw a woman matching Amy’s description taking an elevator to the ship’s deck with cigarettes and a lighter. However, this did not lead to any findings.

Another witness was a cab driver where he stated that a woman matching Amy’s description approached him and said she urgently needed a phone. This sighting was never confirmed by authorities. 

In August 1998, a Canadian computer engineer claimed to have seen Amy walking down with two men on a beach in Curaçao, five months after the disappearance was made public. The witness noticed that the woman was constantly trying to get his attention until he lost sight of her at a nearby café. The woman's tattoos were reportedly identical to Bradley's and man said he was “two feet away from her” and he was sure it was her with complete certainty.

In January 1999, a U.S. Navy petty officer claimed to have seen a woman who claimed to be Amy Bradley at a brothel in Curaçao. He claimed she told him that "her name was Amy Bradley and [she] begged him for help", explaining that she was held against her will and not allowed to leave and did not report the incident earlier as he feared for his career in the Navy having been in a brothel. The witness only contacted Amy’s family after he retired and saw her picture in a magazine. There was no evidence to support the witness’s claim.

There was another potential sighting in March of 2005 when a witness named Judy Maurer claimed to have seen Bradley in a department store restroom in Barbados. She claimed a woman entered the restroom accompanied by three men who proceeded to threaten her if she did not follow through on a deal. She alleges that after the men left, she approached the distraught woman who said that her first name was Amy and that she was from Virginia before the men re-entered and took her away. Maurer called authorities and they created composite sketches of three men and the woman based on her account.

Events after the disappearance 
In more recent years, Amy’s case has been revisited a couple of times. The cold case has resurfaced on America’s Most Wanted and on an episode on Dr Phil. In the fall of 1999, Amy’s parents received an email from a self-proclaimed Navy Seal Soldier – Frank Jones. Frank told the family that he was a former US Army Special officer with a team of experienced soldiers who might be able to rescue Amy. Jones had claimed that his team had seen Amy being held by heavily armed Colombian personnel in a housing complex surrounded by barbed wire. The team also gave an accurate description of Amy’s tattoos and sang the lullaby that Amy’s mother used to sing for Amy. Over the next few months, Frank would feed news to the family and provided reports on sightings of their daughter. When Jones told them they were going to attempt a rescue, he added that more funds were needed. The Bradleys sent Jones a total of $210,000 to fund the set up for Amy’s search and had expected a call from Jones and his team for the results of the rescue mission that never came. Jones had made the story up and had tried to scam the Bradleys of money. In February 2002, federal prosecutors in Richmond charged him with defrauding the Bradleys of $24,444 and the National Missing Children’s Organization of $186,416. Jones pleaded guilty in April of mail fraud and was sentenced to 5 years in prison.

Another incident involved the finding of a jawbone that  washed ashore in Aruba in 2010. Initially, it was thought to be the jawbone of another missing person’s case – Natalee Holloway – but once the jawbone was cleared of Holloway, authorities ceased any further testing despite the fact that there were nine other Caribbean vacationers that were said to be missing.  No DNA testing was done on the material. They say that the bone is human and was likely from a Caucasian origin.

Bradley's mother and father appeared on the November 17, 2005 episode of Dr. Phil. An image of a young woman resembling Bradley that was emailed to her parents was shown on the program and it suggests that she might have been sold into sexual slavery. An email was sent to the Bradley family website containing two photographs of a woman that closely resembled Amy. The photographs were observed by a member of an organization that attempts to track victims on sites that feature sex workers. The woman in the photo has been said to appear “distraught and despondent”  and was a sex worker known as Jas.

Theories on the disappearance 
There are some theories that are circulating the internet in regard to the disappearance of Amy Lynn Bradley. One of these theories was that she was kidnapped and sold into the illegal human trafficking industry in the Caribbean. This theory is supported by various sources of evidence including a key witness from a US Navy Officer claiming that he heard a worker at a brothel in the Caribbean claiming to be Amy and a 2005 photo that was emailed to Amy’s family. Another piece of evidence would include the inconsistencies of the witnesses on the night of the disappearance. In People’s Magazine, Amy’s mother stated, “I remember watching people watch her admiringly” and later goes on to say “Amy would have been a trophy." This theory also includes suspicions of the staff/band members on the cruise on the night of the disappearance. One of these suspicions include the inconsistent story that the band member ‘Yellow’ presented to the authorities as opposed to what CCTV has captured that night. Many people suspected that a waiter was also involved with the disappearance. Throughout the night, Amy’s family was approached by the same waiter asking to pass on a note to Amy for him involving an invitation for her to go drinking with him once they reach shore. In addition, the professional photographer had printed out all photos taken throughout the cruise to sell at a stall, but the family could not find any of Amy’s photos making them think that the photos had been removed by somebody.

Another theory authorities considered was that Amy was murdered on the ship and thrown overboard. However, the only evidence supporting this is the discovery of a jawbone which washed ashore on a beach in Aruba.

The final theory includes Amy falling overboard or committing suicide as initially suggested by the authorities.

Amy Lynn Bradley was declared legally dead on 24 March 2010, 12 years after the disappearance with no witnesses and no body found.

Aftermath and rewards 
The FBI is currently offering a reward of up to $25,000 for any information that could potentially lead to the recovery of Amy Lynn Bradley or leads to an arrest or conviction of the person(s) responsible for Amy’s disappearance. On top of this, the family is awarding $250,000 for information leading to her safe return and the family also has a reward of $50,000 for information leading to her current location. 

Her case was featured on America's Most Wanted and the television show Disappeared. Her case was also the subject of episode 59 of the Casefile podcast and the podcasts Crime Junkie and The Casual Criminalist.

Renewed attention was paid to her case after the disappearance of Natalee Holloway in 2005.

See also 
 
 
 
 List of people who disappeared mysteriously at sea

References

External links 
 FBI Kidnappings/Missing Persons
 Family's website
 MSNBC June 9, 2005 interview
 Visit Aruba Missing Persons
 The Charley Project
 Van Zandt interview
 Casefile True Crime Podcast - Case 59: Amy Lynn Bradley - 18 August 2017

1974 births
1990s missing person cases
1998 in the Caribbean
March 1998 events in North America
Missing people
People from Petersburg, Virginia
People lost at sea